Skrapar Castle, also known as Gjenivizi Castle, is a medieval castle located on a large hill in southwest of Çorovodë.

References
 http://beratkulture.org/?p=100

Castles in Albania
Buildings and structures in Skrapar